Hvozd is a municipality and village in Prostějov District in the Olomouc Region of the Czech Republic. It has about 600 inhabitants.

Administrative parts
Villages of Klužínek, Otročkov and Vojtěchov are administrative parts of Hvozd.

References

Villages in Prostějov District